Cartazolate (SQ-65,396) is a drug of the pyrazolopyridine class. It acts as a GABAA receptor positive allosteric modulator at the barbiturate binding site of the complex and has anxiolytic effects in animals. It is also known to act as an adenosine antagonist at the A1 and A2 subtypes and as a phosphodiesterase inhibitor. Cartazolate was tested in human clinical trials and was found to be efficacious for anxiety but was never marketed. It was developed by a team at E.R. Squibb and Sons in the 1970s.

Synthesis

Condensation of aminopyrazole (1) with diethyl ethoxymethylenemalonate (2) gives the product of the addition-elimination (3). The product tautomerizes spontaneously to the hydroxypyridine (4). The hydroxyl group is then converted to the chloro-derivative by means of phosphorus oxychloride (5). Displacement of halogen by n-butylamine gives the antidepressant compound cartazolate. Displacement of halogen by the basic nitrogen of acetone hydrazone affords the antidepressant etazolate.

See also 
 Etazolate
 ICI-190,622
 Tracazolate

References 

Adenosine receptor antagonists
Amines
Ethyl esters
Carboxylate esters
GABAA receptor positive allosteric modulators
Phosphodiesterase inhibitors
Pyrazolopyridines
Butyl compounds